Bentonville Municipal Airport  is a city-owned, public-use airport located two nautical miles (3.7 km) south of the central business district of Bentonville, a city in Benton County, Arkansas, United States. It is also known as Louise M. Thaden Field or Louise Thaden Field, a name it was given in 1951 to honor Louise McPhetridge Thaden (1905–1979), an aviation pioneer from Bentonville.

This airport is included in the FAA's National Plan of Integrated Airport Systems for 2009–2013, which categorizes it as a general aviation facility. Although most U.S. airports use the same three-letter location identifier for the FAA and IATA, this airport is assigned VBT by the FAA but has no designation from the IATA.

Facilities and aircraft 
It has one paved runway designated 18/36 with a surface measuring 4,426 by 65 feet (1,349 x 20 m) and one turf runway measuring 2,400 by 75 feet (732 x 23 m) designated 17/35, available for use in day VFR conditions.

For the 12-month period ending August 31, 2015, the airport had 32,300 aircraft operations, an average of 88 per day: 99.7% general aviation and 0.3% military. At that time there were 77 aircraft based at this airport: 87% single-engine, 7.8% multi-engine and 2.6% helicopter.

In 2018 a major update of the airport was completed, including a new flight center, public meeting rooms, a museum, and a restaurant, "Louise", added to the northern border with Lake Bentonville.

References

External links 
 Summit Aviation, the fixed-base operator (FBO)
 Aerial image as of 28 February 2001 from USGS The National Map
 

Airports in Arkansas
Buildings and structures in Bentonville, Arkansas
Transportation in Benton County, Arkansas